Alliant Energy PowerHouse (formerly Five Seasons Center and later U.S. Cellular Center) is a multi-purpose arena located in the downtown area of Cedar Rapids, Iowa. It was financed by the approval of a voter referendum to allocate special municipal capital improvement bond monies, after several prior bond referendums to build a civic center failed between 1965 and 1977. The initial construction cost was approximately $7 million for the arena and facilities. The city approved an additional $1 million to build an adjacent multi-level parking facility connected to the center by a skywalk. The center is adjoined by a 16-story DoubleTree hotel facility built directly above the arena.

About the venue

The center hosts local sporting events and concerts, most notably the Iowa State High School Girls Volleyball Tournament and the Iowa High School Team Dual Wrestling Championships. It was opened in 1979 as the Five Seasons Center and hosted the English progressive-rock band Yes as its first official concert event on April 25, 1979. The arena has a basketball capacity of about 6,900 and can seat up to 8,600 for concerts. It served as the primary sports and entertainment venue in Eastern Iowa until the completion of Carver–Hawkeye Arena in Iowa City four years later. Former professional tenants include the Cedar Rapids River Raiders of the United States Basketball League, the Cedar Rapids Sharpshooters of the Global Basketball Association and the Cedar Rapids Silver Bullets of the Continental Basketball Association. Numerous commencement ceremonies are held at the arena.

The venue hosted the initial World Championship Wrestling (WCW) Souled Out event in 1997. It also hosted WCW's Clash of the Champions XXVIII event in 1994 and a WCW Monday Nitro event in 1999. As the Five Seasons Center, it was the site of two early Ultimate Fighting Championship events: UFC 21 in 1999, and UFC 26 the following year. One notable wrestling match in 1989 had Andre the Giant arrested by police after attacking a KCRG-TV photographer filming the match. He was charged with assault and later acquitted, though he was still fined for criminal mischief and damage to KCRG's equipment.

In early June 2008, the U.S. Cellular Center was flooded with water from the Iowa flood of 2008.

The arena closed in July 2011 to undergo renovations as part of a larger project to build a convention complex around the site, which also includes renovations to the new DoubleTree by Hilton Hotel. Events were diverted to other venues in the area, including the ImOn Ice Arena (also managed by VenuWorks) and Carver-Hawkeye Arena, during that time. The complex was re-opened for a concert by Lady Antebellum on June 1, 2013. It was selected as the host arena for the NCAA Division II National Volleyball tournament December 12–14, 2013.

It was home to the Cedar Rapids Titans/River Kings of the Indoor Football League from 2014 to 2019.

On October 17, 2014, US Cellular Center held an NBA preseason game between the Milwaukee Bucks and Minnesota Timberwolves.

The City of Cedar Rapids announced on October 23, 2020, that it had reached a naming rights agreement with Alliant Energy, the region's electricity provider, that took effect July 1 and lasts twelve years.

Naming history
Five Seasons Center 
U.S. Cellular Center 
Alliant Energy PowerHouse

Noted performers

AC/DC
Alan Jackson
Barry Manilow
Dierks Bentley
Elton John
Eric Clapton
Flyleaf
Godsmack
Grateful Dead
John Denver
John Mellencamp
Keith Urban
Kenny Chesney
Kenny Rogers
KISS
Metallica
Nickelback
The Oak Ridge Boys
Ozzy Osbourne
Red Hot Chili Peppers
Tesla
Toby Keith
Trans-Siberian Orchestra
Van Halen
Widespread Panic
Yes
ZZ Top

Sources:

External links 
 
 The Concert Database

References

1979 establishments in Iowa
Basketball venues in Iowa
Buildings and structures in Cedar Rapids, Iowa
Cedar Rapids River Kings
Sports in Cedar Rapids, Iowa
Sports venues completed in 1979
Tourist attractions in Cedar Rapids, Iowa
Indoor arenas in Iowa
Indoor soccer venues in the United States